Bellán or Bellan is a surname. Notable people with the surname include:

 Alicia Bellán (1931–2018), Argentine actress
  (1897–1976), Austrian draughtsperson
 Josette Bellan, Romanian-French-American fluid dynamicist
 Juraj Bellan (born 1996), Slovak racing cyclist
 Steve Bellán (1849–1932), Cuban-American baseball player